Margaret Allison Bonds ( – ) was an American composer, pianist, arranger, and teacher.  One of the first Black composers and performers to gain recognition in the United States, she is best remembered today for her popular arrangements of African-American spirituals and frequent collaborations with Langston Hughes.

Life

Family background and life 
Margaret Jeanette Allison Majors was born on March 3, 1913, in Chicago, Illinois. Her father, Monroe Alpheus Majors, was an active force in the civil rights movement as a physician and writer. His work included the founding of a medical association for black physicians who were denied membership in the American Medical Association on the basis of race. As an author, Majors is known for his book, Noted Negro Women: Their Triumphs and Activities (1893), and for his work as editor of several African-American newspapers. Her mother, Estelle C. Bonds, was a church musician and member of the National Association of Negro Musicians.  She died in 1957. Margaret was close to both of her parents; their influence in her life is undoubtedly clear in her own work as a musician.

In 1940, Margaret Bonds married Lawrence Richardson (1911-1990), a probation officer, after moving to New York City in 1939. The couple later had a daughter, Djane Richardson (1946-2011). When Bonds passed away on April 26, 1972, in Los Angeles, California, she was survived by her husband, daughter, and sister.

Childhood and background info 
In 1917, when she was four years old, Margaret's parents divorced.  She grew up in her mother's home and was given her mother's maiden name, Bonds. Bonds grew up in a home visited by many of the leading black writers, artists, and musicians of the era; among houseguests were sopranos Abbie Mitchell, and Lillian Evanti, and composers Florence Price and Will Marion Cook, all of whom would become influential to her future musical studies and career.  Bonds showed an early aptitude for composition, writing her first work, Marquette Street Blues, at the age of five.  Her first musical studies were with her mother, who taught Margaret piano lessons at home.

Bonds worked as an accompanist for dances and singers in various shows and supper clubs around Chicago; she also copied music parts for other composers.

Education 
During high school, Bonds studied piano and composition with Florence Price and William Dawson. In 1929, at the young age of 16, Bonds began her studies at Northwestern University, where she earned both her Bachelor of Music (1933) and Master of Music (1934) degrees in piano and composition. Bonds was one of the few Black students at Northwestern University; the environment was hostile, racist, and nearly unbearable. Although she was permitted to study there, she was not permitted to reside on campus. Margaret recalls, in an interview with James Hatch: I was in this prejudiced university, this terribly prejudiced place…. I was looking in the basement of the Evanston Public Library where they had the poetry. I came in contact with this wonderful poem, “The Negro Speaks of Rivers,” and I’m sure it helped my feelings of security. Because in that poem he tells how great the black man is. And if I had any misgivings, which I would have to have – here you are in a setup where the restaurants won’t serve you and you’re going to college, you’re sacrificing, trying to get through school – and I know that poem helped save me.Bonds moved to New York City after graduating from Northwestern University.  There she attended the prestigious Juilliard School of Music and studied composition with Roy Harris, Robert Starer, and Emerson Harper, and piano with Djane Herz. She also studied with Walter Gossett. She pursued lessons with Nadia Boulanger, who upon looking at her work said that she needed no further study and refused to teach her.  However, it is inconclusive whether Boulanger truly thought Bonds had no need of further instruction or was acting from a position of racial prejudice.  The work Boulanger refers to is The Negro Speaks of Rivers, a setting for voice and piano of Langston Hughes' poem by the same title—the very poem which brought Bonds such comfort during her years at Northwestern University.

Langston Hughes 
Langston Hughes (1901-1967) was a prolific African-American poet and writer. Hughes and Bonds became great friends after meeting in person in 1936, and she set much of his work to music. On May 22, 1952, Langston (poet), Bonds (pianist), and Daniel Andrews (baritone) collaborated on a project, "An Evening of Music and Poetry in Negro Life," performing at Community Church.  This project took place just months after Bond's debut solo performance at Town Hall in New York City, February 7, 1952. Ever a good friend, Hughes sent Bonds a Western Union telegram the afternoon of her performance, telling her how much he desired to be present and sending his best wishes.

Bonds wrote several music-theater works. In 1959, she set music to Shakespeare in Harlem, a libretto by Hughes. It premiered in 1960 at the 41st Street Theater. Other collaborations include "The Negro Speaks of Rivers," "Songs of the Seasons," and "Three Dream Portraits." Another work based on a text by Langston Hughes was first performed in February 2018 in Washington, DC, by the Georgetown University Concert Choir under Frederick Binkholder.  Entitled  "Simon Bore the Cross", it is a cantata for piano and voice, and is based on the spiritual "He Never Said a Mumblin' Word".

The death of Langston Hughes in 1967 was difficult for Bonds. Afterward, she left her husband and daughter to move from New York to Los Angeles where she remained until her death on April 26, 1972.

Career
Bonds was active in her career throughout her studies at Northwestern University.  In 1932, Bond's composition Sea Ghost won the prestigious national Wanamaker Foundation Prize, bringing her to the public's attention.  On June 15, 1933, Bonds performed with the Chicago Symphony Orchestra—the first black person in history to do so—during its Century of Progress series (Concertino for Piano and Orchestra by John Alden Carpenter). She would return in 1934 to perform Piano Concerto in D Minor composed by former teacher, Florence Price.

After graduation, Bonds continued to teach, compose, and perform in Chicago. Two of her notable students were Ned Rorem and Gerald Cook, with whom she performed piano duos in later years. In 1936, she opened the Allied Arts Academy where she taught art, music, and ballet. That same year, an adaptation of "Peach Tree Street" appeared in Gone With the Wind.

In 1939, she moved to New York City where she edited music for a living and collaborated on several popular songs.   She made her solo performing debut at Town Hall on February 7, 1952. Around this same time, she formed the Margaret Bonds Chamber Society, a group of black musicians which performed mainly the work of black classical composers. Bonds lived in Harlem, and worked on many music projects in the neighborhood.  She helped to establish a Cultural Community Center, and served as the minister of music at a church in the area.

Among Bonds' works from the 1950s is The Ballad of the Brown King, a large-scale work which was first performed in December 1954 in New York. It tells the story of the Three Wise Men, focusing primarily on Balthazar, the so-called "brown king".  It was originally written for voice and piano, but later revised for chorus, soloists, and orchestra, and eventually televised by CBS in 1960. A large work in nine movements, the piece combines elements of various black musical traditions, such as jazz, blues, calypso, and spirituals. Bonds was writing other works during this period of her career: Three Dream Portraits for voice and piano, again setting Hughes' poetry, were published in 1959. D Minor Mass for chorus and organ was first performed in the same year.

As an outgrowth of her compositions for voice, Bonds later became active in the theater, serving as music director for numerous productions and writing two ballets.   In 1964, Bonds wrote Montgomery Variations for orchestra, a set of seven programmatic variations on the spiritual "I Want Jesus to Walk with Me." Bonds penned a program for the work which explains that it centered on Southern Blacks' decision no longer to accept the segregationist policies of the Jim Crow South, focusing on the Montgomery Bus Boycotts and the 1963 bombing of the Sixteenth Street Baptist Church in Birmingham. Bonds shared the completed work with Ned Rorem, a close friend and former student, in 1964. She eventually dedicated the work to Martin Luther King Jr.  Two years later, she moved to Los Angeles, teaching music at the Los Angeles Inner City Institute and at the Inner City Cultural Center. Zubin Mehta and the Los Angeles Philharmonic premiered her Credo for chorus and orchestra in 1972. Bonds died unexpectedly a few months later, shortly after her 59th birthday.

Memberships 
National Association of Negro Musicians' Junior Music Association (High School)
Alpha Kappa Alpha Sorority, Incorporated
National Guild of Piano Teachers (1951)
American Musicians' Welfare Association (1951)
National Association of Colored Women's Clubs (1962)

Legacy 
Margaret Bonds did much to promote the music of black musicians.  Her own compositions and lyrics addressed racial issues of the time. The performance with the Chicago Symphony Orchestra was an historical moment, marking the first occasion a black performer had performed with them as soloist.  Bonds connected her father's political activism with her mother's sense of musicianship. In addition, many well-known arrangements of African-American spirituals (He's Got the Whole World In His Hands) were created by Bonds.

Major works 

Sea Ghost, voice and piano (1932)
Don't You Want to Be Free, music-theater work (1938), Text: Langston Hughes
Wings over Broadway, orchestra (1940) 
Tropics After Dark, musical-theater work (1940)
The Negro Speaks of Rivers, voice and piano (1942)
Troubled Water, piano 
The Ballad of the Brown King, chorus, soloists, and orchestra (1954)
Songs of the Seasons, voice and piano (1955) 
Three Dream Portraits, voice and piano (1959)
Mass in D-Minor, chorus and organ (1959)
Shakespeare in Harlem, music-theater work (1959), Text: Langston Hughes
U.S.A., music-theater work, Text: John Dos Passos
Joshua Fit De Battle of Jericho, voice and orchestra (1959)
Ballad of the Brown King, chorus and orchestra (1960)
Fields of Wonder, men's voices (1963)
Montgomery Variations, orchestra (1964)
Credo, S solo, Bar solo, chorus and orchestra (1965)

Pieces for stage 
 Shakespeare in Harlem, music-theater work (1959), Text: Langston Hughes
 Romey and Julie, Text: R. Dunmore
 U.S.A., music-theater work, Text: R. Dunmore
 The Migration, ballet
 Wings over Broadway, ballet

Pieces for solo voice
Be a little savage with me, Text: Langston Hughes
Chocolate Carmencita, Text: Langston Hughes
Cowboy from South Parkway, Text: Langston Hughes
Didn't it rain!, Spiritual
Empty Interlude, Text: Roger Chaney and Andy Razaf
Ezekiel saw de wheel
Five Creek-Freedmen spirituals (1946)
 "Dry Bones"
 "Sit down servant"
 "Lord, I just can't keep from crying"
 "You can tell the world"
 "I'll reach to heaven"
Georgia (1939), in collaboration with A. Razaf, and J. Davis
Go tell it on the mountain
He's got the whole world in His hands
Hold on
I got a home in that rock
I shall pass through the world
I'll make you savvy
Joshua fit da battle of Jericho, Spiritual
Just a no good man, Text: Langston Hughes
Let's make a dream come true
Lonely little maiden by the sea, Text: Langston Hughes
Market day in Martinique, Text: Langston Hughes
Mary had a little baby
The Negro speaks of rivers (1942), Text: Langston Hughes
No good man
Peachtree street
Pretty flower of the tropics, Text: Langston Hughes and Arna Bontemps
Rainbow gold, Text: Roger Cheney
Sing aho, Spiritual
Six Songs on Poems by Edna St. Vincent Millay
"Women Have Loved Before as I Love Now"
"Hyacinth"
"Even in the Moment"
"Feast"
"I Know My Mind"
"What Lips My Lips Have Kissed"
Songs of the Seasons, Text: Langston Hughes
 "Poem d'automne"
 "Winter-moon"
 "Young love in spring"
 "Summer storm"
Spring will be so sad when she comes this year (1940), in collaboration with H. Dickinson
Sweet nothings in Spanish, Text: Langston Hughes and Arna Bontemps
Three Sacred Songs
"No Man Has Seen His Face"
"Touch the Hem of His Garment"
"Faith in Thee"
Tain't no need, Text: Roger Cheney
Three dream portraits (1959)
To a brown girl dead, Text: Countee Cullen
The way we dance in Chicago/Harlem, Text: Langston Hughes
When the dove enters in, Text: Langston Hughes
When the sun goes down in rhumba land, Text: Langston Hughes and Arna Bontemps
The Pasture (1959), Text: R. Frost
Stopping by the Woods on a Snowy Evening (1963), Text: R. Frost

Pieces for piano
Lillian M. Bowles: For the piano
Troubled water(1967)
Two Piano Pieces
"Tangamerican"
"Fugal Dance

 Spiritual Suite

Choral pieces
Ballad of the brown king (SATB, tenor solo), Text: Langston Hughes
Children's sleep (SATB), Text: Vernon Glasser
Credo (soprano solo, baritone solo, SATB chorus, piano) (1966), Text: W.E.B. Du Bois<ed. John Michael Cooper (Bryn Mawr, Pennsylvania: Hildegard Publishing Company, 2020)>
Credo (soprano solo, baritone solo, SATB chorus, orchestra) (1967), text: W.E.B. Du Bois<ed. John Michael Cooper (Bryn Mawr, Pennsylvania: Hildegard Publishing Company, 2020)>
 Touch the Hem of His Garment (S solo, SATB chorus, piano) (1968). Text: Janice Lovoos. (see also under 'Pieces for Solo Voice)
 No Man Has Seen His Face (S or T solo, SATB chorus, piano) (1968). Text: Janice Lovoos. (see also under 'Pieces for Solo Voice)
Ezek'el saw de wheel
Go tell it on the mountain
Hold on
I shall pass through this world (a capella)
Mary had a little baby (SSAA)
The Negro speaks of rivers (1962), Text: Langston Hughes
You can tell the world (SSA)
You can tell the world (TTBB)
Fields of Wonder, song cycle, male chorus, Text: Langston Hughes
Mass in D minor (only Kyrie is extant)
This Little light of mine, spiritual, for soprano, chorus, and orchestra
Touch the Hem of His Garment (Lovoos), for soprano, chorus, and piano 
Standin' in the need of prayer, spiritual, for soprano and chorus
I wish I knew how it would feel to be free, spiritual, for soprano, chorus, and orchestra
Sinner, please don't let this harvest pass, spiritual, for soprano and mixed chorus

List includes works compiled in a monograph published by the Center for Black Music Research at Columbia College Chicago.

Recordings
In the 1960s, Leontyne Price, the first African American opera singer to become internationally famous, commissioned and recorded some of Bonds' arrangements of spirituals. Some of Bonds' music, mainly piano pieces and art songs, has been recorded on various labels, mostly on compilation albums of music by black composers. In 2019 the premiere recording of The Ballad of the Brown King (performed by The Dessoff Choirs and Orchestra)
was released on the Avie label.

• Troubled Water played by Michael Noble on American Dissident (198004840682) 2022.

References

Further reading
Fuller, Sophie. The Pandora Guide to Women Composers. London: HarperCollins, 1994.

Harris, C. C. Jr. "Three Schools of Black Composers and Arrangers 1900-1970." Choral Journal 14, no. 8 (1974).
Hawkins, D. "Bonds, Margaret." In International Dictionary of Black Composer, edited by S.A. Floyd. Chicago: Fitzroy Dearborn, 1999.
Lauritzen, Brian.  "Open Ears: The Endlessly Unfolding Story of Margaret Bonds", April 30, 2018

Thomas, A.J. A Study of the Selected Masses of Twentieth-Century Black Composers: Margaret Bonds, Robert Ray, George Walker. D.M.A. diss., University of Illinois, 1983.
Tischler, A. Fifteen Black American Composers with a Bibliography of their Works. Detroit: Information Coordinators, 1981.
Walker-Hill, Helen. From Spirituals to Symphonies: African-American Women Composers and Their Music. Champaign, IL: University of Illinois Press, 2007.

External links

 

Margaret Bonds American National Biography of the Day
Margaret Bonds Papers. James Weldon Johnson Collection in the Yale Collection of American Literature, Beinecke Rare Book and Manuscript Library.

1913 births
1972 deaths
20th-century American composers
20th-century American pianists
20th-century American women pianists
20th-century classical composers
20th-century classical pianists
20th-century women composers
African-American classical composers
American classical composers
African-American classical pianists
African-American women classical composers
American classical pianists
American women classical composers
American women classical pianists
Bienen School of Music alumni
Classical musicians from Illinois
Jazz arrangers
Jazz-influenced classical composers
Musicians from Chicago
African-American women musicians
20th-century African-American women
20th-century African-American people
20th-century African-American musicians